Gar Kud (also Romanized as Garkadou; also known as Bakhshī, Gar-e Kadū, Gar Kadū, and Gar Kodū) is a village in Doshman Ziari Rural District, Doshman Ziari District, Mamasani County, Fars Province, Iran. At the 2006 census, its population was 161, in 47 families.

References 

Populated places in Mamasani County